The 1990 Metro Conference men's basketball tournament was held March 8–10 at the Mississippi Coast Coliseum in Biloxi, Mississippi. 

Louisville defeated Southern Miss in the championship game, 83–80, to win their eighth Metro men's basketball tournament.

The Cardinals received the conference's automatic bid to the 1990 NCAA Tournament. Southern Miss received an at-large bid.

Format
All eight members of the conference participated. Teams were seeded based on regular season conference records.

Bracket

References

Metro Conference men's basketball tournament
Tournament
Metro Conference men's basketball tournament
Metro Conference men's basketball tournament